Vicuña is a Chilean commune and city in Elqui Province, Coquimbo Region, founded during the government of Bernardo O'Higgins to secure sovereignty over the Elqui Valley. Poet Gabriela Mistral was born there in 1889. It shares borders to the west with the communes of La Higuera, La Serena and Andacollo, to the east with Argentina and to the south with Paihuano and Rio Hurtado. The commune is administered by the municipality of Vicuña, which is the principal city of the Valle de Elqui.

History
Vicuña was founded on February 22, 1821, by Colonel Joaquín Vicuña Larraín, who was the first intendant of Coquimbo Province, by order of Bernardo O'Higgins. He named it Villa de San Isidro de Vicuña. In 1872, its name was shortened to Vicuña, in honor of its founder.

Topography

Vicuña occupies the major part of the mid and upper Elqui River basin, and the entire length of the Turbio river.

The area is dominated by a mountainous backdrop, and extensive plains on the valley floor, where high-quality grapes for pisco are grown, along with other fruits and vegetables.  The La Punilla, Atimonate, Balalita, Los Tilos mountain ranges contain several peaks with altitudes over 4,000 m.

Demographics

The population grew 10.8% (2,350 persons) between 1992 and 2002. There are 12,910 inhabitants in the urban area of the city of Vicuña and 11,100 in rural areas.

Economy
Vicuña is a major center for pisco production. Cooperativa Agrícola Pisquera Elqui Limitada (CAPEL) runs the main pisco distillery in the zone. Economic activity centers on the culture of grapes, fruits, cereals, and vegetables. Other industries include sheep ranching and iron and copper mining. Tourism has grown greatly in the last few years, primarily due to quality hotels and restaurants. The area around Vicuña experiences approximately 300 totally clear days and nights annually, and several large astronomical observatories are located nearby, including the touristic Mammalluca Observatory. The urban area is made up of buildings from around 1900. The city has a square of ancient trees, which displays sculptures that honor Gabriela Mistral, who was awarded the Nobel Prize in Literature. Other points of interest include the Temple of the Immaculate Conception; the Bauer Tower, which houses the office of tourism; and the Gabriela Mistral museums.

Tourism

A few kilometres outside town is the Route of the Grappa, visiting the factories known as pisqueras: Ruta Norte, Capel, Mistral, Tres Erres and Artesanos de Cochiguaz. The Mammalluca Observatory located 9 km north of Vicuña, has tourist and education programs. At the Cerro Tololo Inter-American Observatory, daily tourist visits are offered.

Administration
The commune is administered by the alcalde Fernando Guamán Guamán (Ind.), who is advised by a municipal council of six members:
 René Ahumada Tapia (RN)
 Simón Alquinta Sirvent (UDI)
 Carmen Luz Rojas Araya (PRSD)
 Silvia Piñones Rivera (PPC)
 Mario Aros Carvajal (Ind.)
 Leonor Ortega Wanders (PS)

Within the electoral divisions of Chile, Vicuña is represented in the Chamber of Deputies by deputies Marcelo Díaz (PS) and Mario Bertolino (RN) as a part of the 7th electoral district (together with La Serena, La Higuera, Paiguano and Andacollo). The commune is represented in the Senate by senators Evelyn Matthei (UDI) and Jorge Pizarro (PDC) as part of the 4th senatorial constituency (Coquimbo).

See also
Julio Alberto Mercado Illanes

References

External links
  Municipality of Vicuña
  Portal de Elqui
  Vicuña's Map

Communes of Chile
Populated places established in 1821
Populated places in Elqui Province
1821 establishments in Chile